Tilden "Happy" Campbell (November 21, 1908 – February 23, 1963) was both a former player and head coach for the Alabama baseball team and both a player and assistant coach for the Alabama football team

Coaching career

Football
After his discharge from the Navy, Campbell returned to Alabama as backfield coach in 1945. In 1946, former Alabama assistant coach Harold Drew, in his first year as head coach, hired Campbell to serve as backfield coach at Ole Miss. When Drew returned to Alabama as head coach in 1947, Campbell followed where he resumed his position as backfield coach and retained it through the 1955 season.

Baseball
In Spring 1935, Campbell served as manager for the Troy Trojans of the then Dixie Amateur League and lead the squad to the league championship. He resigned his position with Troy in April 1936 after the team became a professional squad as part of the Class D Alabama–Florida League to place his full focus on the Alabama team. During his tenure as head coach, Campbell led Alabama to nine SEC championships and an appearance in the 1950 College World Series en route to an overall record of 344 wins, 158 losses and 4 ties (344–158–4).

On February 23, 1963, Campbell died of a heart attack at his Tuscaloosa home. The following week, athletic director Bear Bryant announced that both Sam Bailey and Hayden Riley would serve as head baseball coach for the 1963 season.

Head coaching record

|-
| colspan="2"  style="text-align:center" | Total: || 344–158–4

References

External links

1908 births
1963 deaths
Sportspeople from Pine Bluff, Arkansas
Players of American football from Arkansas
Alabama Crimson Tide football players
Coaches of American football from Arkansas
Alabama Crimson Tide football coaches
Ole Miss Rebels football coaches
Baseball players from Alabama
Alabama Crimson Tide baseball players
Baseball coaches from Alabama
Alabama Crimson Tide baseball coaches